Paraskeva Friday is an image based on a personification of Friday as the day of the week and the cult of saints Paraskeva of Iconium, called Friday and Paraskeva of Serbia. In folk tradition, the image of Paraskeva Friday correlates with the image of Goddess, Saint Anastasia of the Lady of Sorrows, and the Week as a personified image of Sunday.

Etymology 
The word paraskeva ( paraskeue) means "preparation [for the Sabbath]; preparation.

Representations of the Eastern Slavs 
For East Slavs, Paraskeva Friday is a personified representation of the day of the week. She was called Linyanitsa, Paraskeva Pyatnitsa, Paraskeva Lyanyanikha, Nenila Linyanitsa. In the church, these days commemorate Paraskeva of Srpska and Paraskeva of Iconium, respectively. On these days, no spinning, washing, or ploughing was done so as not to "dust the Paraskeva or to clog her eyes." It was believed that if the ban was violated, she could inflict disease. One of the decrees of the Stoglav Synod (1551) is devoted to the condemnation of such superstitions:
Yes, by pogosts and by the villages walk false prophets, men and wives, and maidens, and old women, naked and barefoot, and with their hair straight and loose, shaking and being killed. And they say that they are Saint Friday and Saint Anastasia and that they command them to command the canons of the church. They also command the peasants in Wednesday and in Friday not to do manual labour, and to wives not to spin, and not to wash clothes, and not to kindle stones.The most common idol was the sculpture of Paraskeva Pyatnitsa – not only for Russians, but also for neighbouring peoples. Previously, in the chapels in foreign areas "there were images made of wood rough work of St. Paraskeva and Nicholas... All carved images of Saints Paraskeva and Nicholas have the common name of Pyatnits". In the Russians were widespread sculptures: "[a] wooden painted statue of Pyatnitsa, sometimes in the form of a woman in oriental dress, and sometimes in the form of a simple woman in paneve and lapti". The statue of Paraskeva "was placed in churches in special cabinets and people prayed before this idol".

In eastern Slavic cultures, wooden sculptures of Paraskeva Pyatnitsa were also placed on wells, sacrifices were brought to her (clothes, kudel, threads, and sheep's wool were thrown down a well). The rite was called mokrida (Mokosh). 
Silver hryvnias and quintuplets at the bottom of wells... various articles of women's free will be handed over or thrown directly, often with a loud declaration of the direct purpose of the donation: sewn linen as shirts, towels to decorate the corolla and countenance, combed out linen hemp or straightened ready threads, and wool (sheep's wool) ("To the Weasel for chulovki! ", "To Mother Friday for an apron!" - the women shout on such occasions).- C. V. MaximovIn ancient times, special columns with a picture of the saint were placed at crossroads and on roads that were named after her. These monuments were like roadside chapels or crosses and were considered sacred places.

The Russians prayed to Paraskeva Pyatnitsa for protection against the death of livestock, especially cows. The saint was also considered the healer of human ailments, especially devil's obsession, fever, toothache, headache, and other ailments.

Image 

The image of Paraskeva Pyatnitsa according to folk beliefs is different from the iconographic image, where she is depicted as an ascetic-looking woman in a red maforiya. The carved icon of Paraskeva Pyatnitsa from the village of Illyeshi is widely known. It is revered in the Russian Orthodox Church as a miracle worker and is housed in the Trinity Cathedral of the Alexander Nevsky Lavra in St. Petersburg.

The popular imagination sometimes gave Paraskeva Friday demonic features: tall stature, long loose hair, large breasts, which she throws behind her back, etc., which brings her closer to the female mythological characters like Dola, Death, and Mermaid. There was a ritual of "driving Pyatnitsa" documented in the 18th century: "In Small Russia, in the Starodubsky regiment on a holiday day they drive a plain-haired woman named Pyatnitsa, and they drive her in the church and at church people honour her with gifts and with the hope of some benefit". In the stories Paraskeva Pyatnitsa spins the kudel left by the mistress, punishes the woman who violated the ban, tangles the thread, maybe skin the offending woman, takes away her eyesight, turns her into a frog, or throws forty spindles into the window with orders to strain them until morning. 

According to beliefs, Paraskeva Friday also oversees the observance of other Friday prohibitions, including washing laundry, bleaching canvases, and combing hair.

According to Ukrainian beliefs, Friday walks are littered with needles and spindles of negligent hosts who do not honour the saint and her days. Until the 19th century, the custom of "leading Pyatnitsa" - a woman with loose hair{ was preserved in Ukraine.

In bylichki and spiritual verses Paraskeva Pyatnitsa complains that she is not honoured by not observing the Friday prohibitions - they prick her with spindles, spin her hair, clog her eyes kostra. According to beliefs, the icons depict Paraskeva Friday with spokes or spindles sticking out of her chest (cf. images of Our Lady of the Seven Spears or Softening of the Evil Hearts).

In the folk calendar 
Some regions of Serbia and Bosnia also celebrate , called Petka Trnovska, Petka Trnovka, Trnovka Petka, Mlada Petka, Petka Vodonosha. In Bulgaria (Frakia), St. Petka is dedicated to the Friday after Easter, and in Serbia (Požega) the Friday before St. Evdokija Day

Ninth Friday 
The celebration of the ninth Friday after Easter was widespread among Russians. In Solikamsk, the miraculous deliverance of the city from the invasion of Nogais and voguls in 1547 was remembered on this day.

In Nikolsky County, Vologda province, on the ninth Friday there was a custom to "build a customary linen": the girls would come together, rub the flax, spin and weave the linen in a day.

For the Komi people, the ninth Friday was called the "Covenant Day of the Sick". It was believed that on this day the miracle-working icon of Paraskeva Pyatnitsa ( from the chapel in the village of Krivoy Navolok could bring healing to the sick. There is still a tradition of crucesion to the Ker-yu river, where elderly women and girls wash temple and home icons in the waters blessed with the icon of Paraskeva Pyatnitsa. The water is considered holy for three days after the feast, and is collected and taken away with them. Dipping icons in standing water are considered a sin.

See also 
 Deities and fairies of fate in Slavic mythology
 Lauma
 Folk Orthodoxy

References

Literature 

 Пять // Толковый словарь живого великорусского языка : в 4 т. / авт.-сост. В. И. Даль. — 2-е изд. —  : Типография М. О. Вольфа, 1880–1882.
 Параскева Пятница / Левкиевская Е. Е., Толстая С. М. // Славянские древности: Этнолингвистический словарь : в 5 т. / под общ. ред. Н. И. Толстого; :ru:Институт славяноведения РАН. —  : Межд. отношения, 2009. — Т. 4: П (Переправа через воду) — С (Сито). — С. 631—633. — ISBN 5-7133-0703-4, 978-5-7133-1312-8.
 Максимов С. В. Параскева Пятница; Вода-Царица // Нечистая, неведомая и крестная сила. — : Товарищество Р. Голике и А. Вильворг, 1903. — С. 516—518, 225–250.

Links 
 Параскева Пятница (hrono.ru)
 Параскева // Российский этнографический музей
 Пятница // Энциклопедия культур
 Успенский Б. А. Почитание Пятницы и Недели в связи с культом Мокоши // Успенский Б. А. Филологические разыскания в области славянских древностей
 Рыбаков Б. А. Двоеверие. Языческие обряды и празднества XI—XIII веков // Рыбаков Б. А. Язычество Древней Руси
 Страсти по Святой Параскеве (dralexmd.livejournal.com)
 Basil Lourié. Friday Veneration in the Sixth- and Seventh-Century Christianity and the Christian Legends on Conversion of Nağrān (англ.)

Friday
Pages with unreviewed translations
Slavic legendary creatures
Supernatural beings identified with Christian saints
Folk Orthodoxy